Lieutenant General Emomali Abdur Rahim Sobirzoda (Tajik: Эмомалӣ Абдураҳим Собирзода; born July 20, 1972) is a Tajik military leader and the current Chief of the General Staff of the Armed Forces of the Republic of Tajikistan. He also serves as First Deputy Minister of Defense, serving since November 2015 when he replaced Major General Zarif Bobokalonov. He recently oversaw the development of military relations between Tajikistan, Russia, the United States and Uzbekistan.

Biography

Sobirzoda was born on July 20, 1972 in the city of Vahdat to a family of labor workers. He commenced his military career in 1992, immediately serving in military units that were deployed during the Tajik Civil War. He graduated from the Military Institute (then military college) of the Ministry of Defence of Tajikistan, and from Kulob State University in the mid-1990s before moving to Russia where he would stay from 1999-2001. In February 2010, he was appointed to the position of Commander of the Tajik Ground Forces. He served in this position for 5 years until November 24, 2015, when by of President Emomali Rahmon and the approval of the government, Sobirzoda was made Chief of the General Staff, succeeding Major General Zarif Bobokalonov.

See also
 Chief of the General Staff
 Ministry of Defence (Tajikistan)
 Armed Forces of the Republic of Tajikistan
 Sherali Mirzo
 Sherali Khayrulloyev

References

1972 births
Living people
Tajikistani generals
Chiefs of the General Staff (Tajikistan)